This is the list of cathedrals and co-cathedrals in Argentina sorted by denomination.

Roman Catholic 
Cathedrals of the Roman Catholic Church in Argentina:

 Cathedral Shrine of Lord and the Virgin of the Miracle in Salta
 Basilica and Convent of St Francis in Salta
 Catedral Basílica de Nuestra Señora del Valle in San Fernando del Valle de Catamarca
 Cathedral of Our Lady of Mount Carmel in General Roca
 Cathedral of Our Lady of the Valley in Añatuya
 Cathedral of St. George in Córdoba (Melkite Greek)
 Catedral Nuestra Señora de la Asunción in Avellaneda
 Cathedral of Our Lady of the Rosary in Azul
 Cathedral of Our Lady of Mercy in Bahía Blanca
 Cathedral of the Holy Trinity in Buenos Aires
 Cathedral of Our Lady of Rosary in Cafayate
 Cathedral of St. John Bosco in Comodoro Rivadavia
 Cathedral of St. Anthony of Padua in Concordia
 Cathedral of Our Lady of the Assumption in Córdoba
 Cathedral of Our Lady of the Rosary in Corrientes
 Catedral Nuestra Señora del Valle in Cruz del Eje
 Cathedral of the Sacred Heart of Jesus in Esquel
 Cathedral of Our Lady of Carmel in Formosa
 Cathedral of Our Lady of the Rosary in Goya
 Cathedral of Christ the King in Gregorio de Laferrère
 Cathedral of St. Joseph in Gualeguaychú
 Cathedral of Our Lady of Candelaria in Humahuaca
 Cathedral Basilica of the Holy Saviour in San Salvador de Jujuy
 Cathedral of Our Lady of Sorrows in La Plata
 Catedral Basílica de San Nicolás de Bari in La Rioja
 Catedral Basílica de Nuestra Señora de La Paz in Lomas de Zamora
 Catedral Basílica de los Santos Pedro y Cecilia in Mar del Plata
 Cathedral of Our Lady of Loreto in Mendoza
 Cathedral Basilica of Our Lady of Mercy in Mercedes
 Cathedral of Our Lady of the Rosary in Moreno
 Cathedral Basilica of the Immaculate Conception of the Good Journey in Morón
 Cathedral of Mary Help of Christians in Neuquén
 Cathedral of St. Anthony of Padua in Oberá
 Cathedral of the Star of the Sea in Buenos Aires
 Catedral San Ramón Nonato in Orán
 Cathedral of Our Lady of the Rosary in Paraná
 Cathedral of St. Joseph in Posadas
 Catedral Virgen del Carmen in Puerto Iguazú
 Cathedral of the Immaculate Conception in Quilmes
 Catedral San Rafael in Rafaela
 Cathedral of the Immaculate Conception in Reconquista
 Cathedral of St. Fernando the King in Resistencia
 Cathedral of Our Lady of Luján in Río Gallegos
 Cathedral Basilica of Our Lady of the Rosary in Rosario
 Catedral Nuestra Señora del Nahuel Huapi in San Carlos de Bariloche
 Cathedral of St. Maron in Buenos Aires (Maronite Rite)
 Cathedral of St. Francis of Assisi in San Francisco
 Cathedral of Our Lady of Narek in Buenos Aires (Armenian Catholic)
 Cathedral of St. Isidor the Worker in San Isidro
 Cathedral of St. John the Baptist in San Juan
 Cathedral of Sts. Just and Pastor in San Justo
 Cathedral of the Immaculate Conception in San Luis
 Cathedral of Jesus the Shepherd in San Martín
 Cathedral of St. Michael the Archangel in San Miguel
 Cathedral of Nicholas of Bari in San Nicolás
 Cathedral of St. Raphael the Archangel in San Rafael
 Catedral San Roque in Presidencia Roque Sáenz Peña
 Cathedral of All Saints in Santa Fe
 Catedral Nuestra Señora del Patrocinio (Pokrov) in Buenos Aires (Ukrainian Rite)
 Cathedral of St. Rose of Lima in Santa Rosa
 Catedral Basílica Nuestra Señora del Carmen in Santiago del Estero
 Cathedral of the Immaculate Conception in Santo Tomé
 Cathedral of Our Lady of the Incarnation in San Miguel de Tucumán
 Cathedral of the Immaculate Conception in Venado Tuerto
 Cathedral of Our Lady of Mercy in Viedma
 Cathedral of the Immaculate Conception in Río Cuarto
 Cathedral of the Immaculate Conception in Villa María
 Catedral Santa Florentina in Campana
 Co-cathedral of the Nativity of the Lord in Belén de Escobar

Eastern Orthodox
Cathedrals of Eastern Orthodox Churches in Argentina:
 Annunciation Cathedral in Buenos Aires (Russian Orthodox)
 Cathedral of the Resurrection in Buenos Aires (Russian Orthodox Church Outside Russia)
 Cathedral of the Dormition of the Theotokos in Buenos Aires (Greek Orthodox Patriarchate of Constantinople)
 St. George Antiochian Orthodox Cathedral, Buenos Aires

Anglican
Anglican Cathedrals in Argentina:
 Catedral de San Juan Bautista in Buenos Aires

See also
List of cathedrals

References

Cathedrals in Argentina
Cathedrals
Argentina
Cathedrals